Kemmerer Junior Senior High School is a high school in rural Kemmerer, Lincoln County, Wyoming, United States. The principal is Shawn Rogers.  The school's office and mailing address are in Diamondville.  It is the only high school in its school district, Lincoln County School District Number 1. Kemmerer, Cokeville High School, and Star Valley High School are the only high schools in Lincoln County

The high school has a number of notable athletic teams and activities.  The school's wrestling program has had a number of "All-American" wrestlers, as well as the team winning their first state wrestling title in 2021. The school boasts the longest losing streak in Wyoming football history, at 36 games.

In academics, the school ranks (8 out of 10).

Notable alumni 

 Jerry Buss (1933–2013), Owner of the Los Angeles Lakers
 Edgar Herschler (1918–1990), Governor of Wyoming

See also
List of high schools in Wyoming
Education in Lincoln County

References

External links
Kemmerer High School official website

Public high schools in Wyoming
Schools in Lincoln County, Wyoming
Kemmerer, Wyoming